Babor may refer to:

Places
Babor Mountains
Babor District, Algeria
Babor, Sétif
Djebel Babor Nature Reserve

People
Karl Babor (died 1964), Nazi SS doctor of the German Third Reich
Kirstie Joan Babor, Philippine fashion model 
Valentina Babor (born 1989), German classical pianist

See also
Babar (disambiguation)
Babur (disambiguation)